Robert I. Millonzi (1910–1986) was an American lawyer and member of the Securities and Exchange Commission under President Harry S. Truman.  He was a member of the 1967 U.S. delegation to the United Nations Economic and Social Council.  He was the brother of American artist Victor Millonzi.

As a partner in the Buffalo law firm Diebold & Millonzi, he was nominated by President Truman in June 1951 to the Securities and Exchange Commission to replace Commissioner Edward McCormick, who had resigned to head the New York Curb Exchange. Millonzi was confirmed by the U.S. Senate and sworn in as an S.E.C. commissioner on June 21, 1951 to complete a term which ended on June 5, 1952, at which time Millonzi resigned, expressing a desire to return to his law firm in Buffalo.

Millonzi used his influence to support the performing arts. He served on the executive committee of the Buffalo Philharmonic Orchestral Society. In February 1967 U.S. President Lyndon Johnson appointed him to the board of trustees of the John F. Kennedy Center for the Performing Arts.

Millonzi was appointed by New York Governor Mario Cuomo in July 1983 to chair a commission to study the distribution of inexpensive hydroelectric power in the state as contracts for power from the Niagara and St. Lawrence-Franklin D. Roosevelt Power Projects expired. Under his leadership, the commission recommended on February 29, 1984,  a re-allocation of a portion of that power from upstate New York to homes and businesses downstate, and to reserve power for businesses to help create jobs. The New York Legislature deferred action on these recommendations following a ruling by the United States Court of Appeals for the Second Circuit which allowed the existing contracts with private upstate utilities to continue until they expired in 1990.

References
"Millonzi to Be Sworn In: Justice Jackson Will Give Oath to S.E.C. Appointee", New York Times, 19 June 1951, p 46.
"Millonzi Quits S.E.C. to Resume Law Practice", New York Times, 6 June 1952, p 33.
"3 Renamed, 4 Appointed to Kennedy Center Board", New York Times, 24 February 1967, p25.
Gargan, Edward A., "A Divided Panel Calls for Sending Cheap Upstate Hydropower Downstate", New York Times, 1 March 1984, p B1 and B11.
Barbanel, Josh, "Low-Cost Power: A Reallocation Is Deferred", New York Times, 27 September 1984, p A24.

1910 births
1986 deaths
20th-century American lawyers
Members of the U.S. Securities and Exchange Commission
Truman administration personnel